Shterev is a Bulgarian masculine surname, its feminine counterpart is Shtereva. It may refer to
Nikola Shterev (1903–1972), Bulgarian football player and coach
Nikolina Shtereva (born 1955), Bulgarian middle-distance runner 
Simeon Shterev (disambiguation)
Vanya Shtereva (born 1970), Bulgarian singer and writer

Bulgarian-language surnames